UFC Fight Night: Nogueira vs. Davis (also known as UFC Fight Night 24) was a mixed martial arts event held by the Ultimate Fighting Championship on March 26, 2011 at the KeyArena in Seattle, Washington.

Background

The event did not lead into the season premiere of The Ultimate Fighter 13 as has been the case for most of that program's seasonal debuts.  That took place on March 30.

On February 19, 2011, Dana White alerted followers on Twitter that Tito Ortiz had to pull out of his fight with Antônio Rogério Nogueira, after receiving a severe cut on his forehead, and would be replaced by Phil Davis.

On March 5, Duane Ludwig was forced out of his fight with Amir Sadollah due to injury. James Wilks was tapped as his replacement. Wilks then injured himself, and was forced to withdraw from the bout. DaMarques Johnson was the replacement.
Also on March 5, Dennis Hallman suffered a knee injury in training and was forced out of his bout against TJ Waldburger. Johny Hendricks stepped in as Hallman's replacement.

On March 16, Nick Pace was forced out of his bout against Michael McDonald due to suffering an injury. Promotional newcomer Edwin Figueroa stepped in as his replacement.

Also on March 16, a broken foot forced Nam Phan out of his rematch with Leonard Garcia and was replaced by Chan Sung Jung creating a rematch from their fight of the night performance at WEC 48: Aldo vs. Faber, which ended in a controversial decision win for Garcia.

The UFC announced via their official Twitter account that five preliminary bouts would stream on Facebook. This would also be the last UFC event until UFC on Fox: Evans vs. Davis the following year to feature at least one unaired preliminary fight.

Results

Bonus awards
Fighters were awarded $55,000 bonuses.

Fight of the Night: Michael McDonald vs. Edwin Figueroa
Knockout of the Night: Johny Hendricks
Submission of the Night: Chan Sung Jung

Reported Payout
The following is the reported payout to the fighters as reported to the Washington State Department of Licensing. It does not include sponsor money or "locker room" bonuses often given by the UFC and also do not include the UFC's traditional "fight night" bonuses.

Phil Davis: $34,000 (includes $17,000 win bonus) def. Antônio Rogério Nogueira: $90,000
Anthony Johnson: $40,000 ($20,000 win bonus) def. Dan Hardy: $25,000
Amir Sadollah: $40,000 ($20,000 win bonus) def. DaMarques Johnson: $14,000
Chan Sung Jung: $10,000 ($5,000 win bonus) def. Leonard Garcia: $18,000
Mike Russow: $28,000 ($14,000 win bonus) def. Jon Madsen: $10,000
Mackens Semerzier: $12,000 ($6,000 win bonus) def. Alex Caceres: $8,000
John Hathaway: $26,000 ($13,000 win bonus) def. Kris McCray: $10,000
Michael McDonald: $10,000 ($5,000 win bonus) def. Edwin Figueroa: $6,000
Christian Morecraft: $12,000 ($6,000 win bonus) def. Sean McCorkle: $10,000
Johny Hendricks: $44,000 ($22,000 win bonus) def. TJ Waldburger: $8,000
Aaron Simpson: $30,000 ($15,000 win bonus) def. Mario Miranda: $10,000
Nik Lentz: $30,000 ($15,000 win bonus) def. Waylon Lowe: $12,000

References

UFC Fight Night
2011 in mixed martial arts
Mixed martial arts in Washington (state)
Sports competitions in Seattle
2011 in sports in Washington (state)